Carex lepida is a species of flowering plant in the sedge family, Cyperaceae. It is endemic to Ecuador. Its natural habitat is subtropical or tropical moist montane forests.

References

lepida
Endemic flora of Ecuador
Critically endangered flora of South America
Plants described in 1867
Taxonomy articles created by Polbot